Isotoma axillaris, commonly known as rock isotome or showy isotome, is a small herbaceous perennial in the family Campanulaceae. It usually has blue or mauve star-shaped flowers from September to May. It may also be called blue star, star flower, or laurentia.

Description
Isotoma axillaris is an upright perennial herb growing to 50 cm high with ascending stems that are often a purplish colour and covered with short, soft hairs quickly becoming  smooth. The single blue to mauve, rarely white or pink flowers appear in the leaf axils. The flower throat is occasionally white, greenish or a yellow colour. Flowering occurs between September and May in the species native range.

Taxonomy and naming
Isotoma axillaris was first formally described by botanist John Lindley in 1826 in Edward's Botanical Register. The specific epithet axillaris is a Latin word meaning "of an axil",  with reference to the flowers borne in the leaf axils.

Distribution and habitat
Showy isotoma occurs in Queensland, New South Wales and Victoria, often in moist crevices on rocky outcrops.

Garden use

I. axillaris is grown as a garden plant. In colder areas, it may be grown as an annual or overwintered indoors.

Gallery

References

External links
Isotoma axillaris: images and occurrence data from Atlas of Living Australia

axillaris
Flora of New South Wales
Flora of Queensland
Victoria
Plants described in 1826
Taxa named by John Lindley